Xoridinae are a worldwide subfamily of the parasitic wasp family Ichneumonidae.

Xoridinae  are idiobiont ectoparasitoids of wood‑boring Coleoptera and Hymenoptera (Symphyta).  Most parasitize larvae. There are four genera.

In general aspect the better-known Xoridinae are large robust black and orange insects with a large tooth on the hind femora. Like their hosts they are woodland species.

References 

 Townes, H.K. (1969): Genera of Ichneumonidae, Part 1 (Ephialtinae, Tryphoninae, Labiinae, Adelognathinae, Xoridinae, Agriotypinae). Memoirs of the American Entomological Institute 11: 1–300.

External links 
 Diagnostic characters
 Waspweb
 Images of pinned specimens
 BugGuide U.S.A.
 Hokkaido University Types in Hokkaido, Japan
 American Entomological Institute

 
Apocrita subfamilies
Taxa named by William Edward Shuckard